"Object of My Desire" is a song recorded by American group Starpoint from the album Restless. The song was released in 1985 by Elektra Records.

It came in as the 93rd biggest song of 1986 according to the Billboard Year-End. No song that peaked as low as number 25 would crack the year-end until seven years later.

The tune was a major hit for the group, becoming their first single to crack the top ten on the R&B singles chart, reaching number 8, and the top 40 on the pop charts, peaking at number 25.  It also entered the dance charts, peaking at number 12, and number 7 on the Dance "Maxi singles" charts. In the United Kingdom, the song reached number 96 on the pop chart.

In 2005, American DJ Dana Rayne released a dance-oriented cover of the song that charted at number 7 in the United Kingdom in early January.

Braden Courtney & Bradley Cooper Version

In 2018, Braden Courtney & Bradley Cooper As The Voices Of Braden & Mr Wolf Covered The Song Object Of My Desire From The 2018 Film Braden & Mr Wolf The Movie, Which Was Premiered On Netflix, Featuring Universal Studios & Working Title Films

The Video Of The Song Features Braden & Mr Wolf Dancing At The Disco In Los Angeles, California

Chart performance

References 

1985 singles
1985 songs
Elektra Records singles
Songs written by Keith Diamond (songwriter)
Freestyle music songs